The Nairobi Women's Hospital is a hospital in Nairobi, Kenya. The hospital was founded in 2001 by Dr. Sam Thenya and is the first of its kind in the East and Central Africa region. Even if it specialised in Obstetrics and Gynecology services, the hospital is equipped and staffed to handle all general medical and surgical conditions.

The Gender Violence Recovery Centre (GVRC), is a charitable trust of The Nairobi Women's Hospital. The Centre was established to provide medical treatment, and psychosocial treatment to survivors of rape and domestic violence who cannot afford treatment since 2001.

Notes

External links
 Nairobi Women's Hospital website
 Gender Violence Recovery Centre
 Hospital Information

Hospitals in Nairobi
Women in Kenya
Women in Nairobi
Violence against women in Kenya